"Mary Had a Little Lamb" is an English language nursery rhyme of nineteenth-century American origin, first published by American writer Sarah Josepha Hale in 1830. It has a Roud Folk Song Index number of 7622.

Background
The nursery rhyme was first published by the Boston publishing firm Marsh, Capen & Lyon, as a poem by Sarah Josepha Hale on May 24, 1830, and was possibly inspired by an actual incident. As described in one of Hale's biographies:

"Sarah began teaching young boys and girls in a small school not far from her home [in Newport, New Hampshire]...It was at this small school that the incident involving 'Mary's Lamb' is reputed to have taken place. Sarah was surprised one morning to see one of her students, a girl named Mary, enter the classroom followed by her pet lamb. The visitor was far too distracting to be permitted to remain in the building and so Sarah 'turned him out.' The lamb stayed nearby till school was dismissed and then ran up to Mary looking for attention and protection. The other youngsters wanted to know why the lamb loved Mary so much and their teacher explained it was because Mary loved her pet. Then Sarah used the incident to get a moral across to the class: Why does the lamb love Mary so?
Mary so, Mary so?

Why does the lamb love Mary so?
The eager children smiled,

Mary loves the lamb, you know,
Lamb, you know, lamb, you know,

Mary loves the lamb, you know The teacher’s happy smile.

Authorship controversy 

In 1876, at the age of 70, Mary Tyler (née Sawyer; March 22, 1806, died December 11, 1889) emerged to claim that she was the "Mary" from the poem. As a young girl, Mary kept a pet lamb that she took to school one day at the suggestion of her brother. A commotion naturally ensued. Mary recalled, "Visiting school that morning was a young man by the name of John Roulstone; a nephew of the Reverend Lemuel Capen, who was then settled in Sterling, Massachusetts. It was the custom then for students to prepare for college with ministers, and, for this purpose, Roulstone was studying with his uncle. The young man was very much pleased with the incident of the lamb, and, the next day, he rode across the fields on horseback, to the little old schoolhouse and handed me a slip of paper, which had written upon it the three original stanzas of the poem" This account is not supported by evidence beyond Mary's memory. The "slip of paper" has never been produced as evidence. The earliest evidence of the poem's publication is Sarah Josepha Hale's 1830 collection of poems, supporting her complete authorship of the poem.

Even though this claim is unsupported by evidence, multiple sites in Sterling, Massachusetts, perpetuate the claim. The Redstone School, where Mary Sawyer attended school and purports the incident took place, was built in 1798. The property was later purchased by Henry Ford and relocated to a churchyard, on the property of Longfellow's Wayside Inn in Sudbury, Massachusetts. Mary Sawyer's house, located in Sterling, Massachusetts, was listed on the National Register of Historic Places in 2000, but was destroyed by arson on August 12, 2007.

Text
The text as originally published consisted of three stanzas, each of eight lines, although the ABAB rhyming scheme allows each stanza to be divided into two four-line parts.

In the 1830s, Lowell Mason set the nursery rhyme to a melody adding repetition in the verses:

Recordings 

The rhyme was the first audio recorded by Thomas Edison on his newly invented phonograph in 1877. It was the first instance of recorded English verse, following the recording of the French folk song "Au clair de la lune" by Édouard-Léon Scott de Martinville in 1860. In 1927, Edison reenacted the recording, which still survives. The earliest recording (1878) was retrieved by 3D imaging equipment in 2012.

Media
Note: This melody is the British version, which is slightly different from the American version. The melody of the fourth bar in the British version consists of one note repeated three times, whereas in the American version, the fourth bar consists of one note, then a note repeated twice that is two steps higher than the previous note.

See also

List of nursery rhymes

References

American children's songs
Traditional children's songs
Songs about sheep
Songs about shepherds
Fictional sheep
Songs about fictional female characters
American nursery rhymes